Peace is an album by trumpeter Chet Baker which was recorded in 1982 and released on the German Enja label.

Reception 

The Allmusic review by Scott Yanow states "This one is a bit unusual since the trumpeter is accompanied by David Friedman (on vibes and marimba), bassist Buster Williams and drummer Joe Chambers. The music is somewhat challenging and it inspires Baker to come up with some lyrical statements. There are many Chet Baker recordings from his final decade and his true fans will want to pick up this one".

Track listing 
All compositions by David Friedman except where noted.
 "3 + 1 = 5" – 7:37
 "	Peace" (Horace Silver) – 4:10
 "Lament for Thelonious" – 10:12
 "The Song Is You" (Jerome Kern, Oscar Hammerstein II) – 7:08
 "Shadows" – 4:37
 "For Now" – 7:30
 "3 + 1 = 5" [alternate take] – 6:54 Bonus track on CD release

Personnel 
Chet Baker – trumpet
David Friedman – vibraphone, marimba
Buster Williams – bass
Joe Chambers – drums

References 

Chet Baker albums
1982 albums
Enja Records albums